West Hill School is a historic school building located at Canajoharie, Montgomery County, New York.  It was designed by prominent local architect Archimedes Russell (1840–1915) and built 1891–1893.  It is a -story, stone masonry institutional building.  It features a stone tower with open belfry containing the original school bell.  It continued in educational use for over 100 years.  It was constructed on the site of the Canajoharie Academy, where in 1846, Susan B. Anthony began a teaching position as head of the girls division.

It was added to the National Register of Historic Places in 2002. It is located in the Canajoharie Historic District.

References

School buildings on the National Register of Historic Places in New York (state)
Romanesque Revival architecture in New York (state)
School buildings completed in 1893
Schools in Montgomery County, New York
National Register of Historic Places in Montgomery County, New York
Individually listed contributing properties to historic districts on the National Register in New York (state)